John Thomas Cooper (21 February 1889 – 20 September 1917) was an Australian rules footballer who played for Fitzroy in the Victorian Football League (VFL).

He was killed on the Menin Road Ridge whilst serving in the First AIF during the Battle of Passchendaele.

Early life 
Jack Cooper was the son of Fred and Florence Cooper. He was born in Fitzroy North on 21 February 1889, and he attended the Alfred Crescent State School in Fitzroy North. In his youth he was a fine cricketer as well as a highly talented footballer, and went on to be a regular player with the Fitzroy Footballers Cricket Club.

He worked for the company of Fitzroy Football Club's President, D.J. "Don" Chandler, as a storeman.

He and his wife, Margaret Malcolm Cooper, née Fletcher, resided at 38 York Street, Fitzroy North, and had one daughter, Margaret Isabel "Maggie" Cooper (1908–?), who became a teacher.

Footballer 
Recruited from the local team North Fitzroy Juniors, he played his first senior VFL game for the Fitzroy Football Club against Collingwood on 27 April 1907 at Victoria Park. In his first season, he played 11 matches and scored 1 goal.

In 1912, after he had been appointed captain of the Fitzroy senior team,a contemporary report spoke of the tough, speedy, skilful, and tenacious Cooper as follows:

He played in the Fitzroy team that won the 1913 premiership by defeating St Kilda 7.14 (56) to 5.13 (43) in the 1913 Grand Final Match; he was one of Fitzroy's best players in that match. He was the Fitzroy club's best and fairest player in both the 1911 and 1914 seasons (see Fitzroy FC honour roll#1910–1919), and he was the Fitzroy team captain in 1912, and its vice-captain from 1913 to 1915.

He also played eight games for Victoria, including the match against South Australia at the Adelaide Oval on 10 August 1912, when he captained the Victorian team that lost to South Australia 9.8 (62) to 6.7 (43).

In his career with Fitzroy he played 136 senior games and scored 8 goals.

He played his last senior VFL game for Fitzroy on Saturday 11 September 1915, in the 1915 Preliminary Final, that was won by Carlton 6.18 (54) to 5.8 (38).

Dealings with VFL Tribunal
He was reported once in his playing career, in the 14 August 1909 match against Carlton at the Brunswick Street Oval, for charging and striking; he was suspended for 12 weeks.

In the 26 June 1915 match against Carlton at the Brunswick Street Oval, a former Fitzroy player, the Carlton centre half-back and team captain Billy Dick, was reported for striking Cooper; Dick was suspended for 10 weeks.

Soldier 
Leaving his employment as a storeman, he enlisted in the 8th Battalion of the First AIF on 8 November 1915 and left for France on the troopship Wiltshire on 7 March 1916.

In France, Cooper saw action in the Battle of the Somme. He was only in the trenches for a short time when he was so badly gassed that once his immediate discomfort had been dealt with, he was repatriated to England to allow him to recuperate.

Having recuperated fully, he played for the (losing) Australian Training Units team in the famous "Pioneer Exhibition Game" of Australian Rules football, held in London, in October 1916, just before returning to active service in France. A news film was taken at the match.

Most likely through the effects of the gas, Cooper's throat continued to give him a lot of trouble (he almost lost his voice) and, once again, he was repatriated to England.

Although he was sent to Aldershot for officer training, he never rose above the rank of Lance-Corporal.

Death
He returned to France once more and was killed in action in Belgium, at Polygon Wood, during the Battle of Passchendaele on 20 September 1917.

His remains were never recovered. He is commemorated in the Menin Gate Memorial to the Missing in Ypres, Belgium; and his name appears at panel 52 in the Commemorative Area at the Australian War Memorial.

See also 
 1916 Pioneer Exhibition Game
 List of Victorian Football League players who died in active service
 Fitzroy FC honour roll

Footnotes

References 
 Photographs at A Victorian Trio, The (Adelaide) Evening Journal, (Friday, 9 August 1912), p.1, and second from right, seated, in second row at :File:Fitzroy_fc_1913.jpg.
 Pioneer Exhibition Game Australian Football: in aid of British and French Red Cross Societies: 3rd Australian Division v. Australian Training Units at Queen's Club, West Kensington, on Saturday, October 28th, 1916, at 3pm, Wightman & Co., (London), 1919.
 Main, J. & Allen, D., "Cooper, Jack", pp. 39–42 in Main, J. & Allen, D., Fallen – The Ultimate Heroes: Footballers Who Never Returned From War, Crown Content, (Melbourne), 2002. 
 Ross, J. (ed), 100 Years of Australian Football 1897–1996: The Complete Story of the AFL, All the Big Stories, All the Great Pictures, All the Champions, Every AFL Season Reported, Viking, (Ringwood), 1996. 
 Footballers in Action: Jack Cooper, The Winner, (Wednesday, 6 December 1916), p.8.
 First World War Embarkation Roll: Private John Thomas Cooper (4753), collection of the Australian War Memorial.
 First World War Nominal Roll: Lance-Corporal John Thomas Cooper (4753), collection of the Australian War Memorial.
 First World War Service Record: Lance-Corporal John Thomas Cooper (4753), National Archives of Australia.
 In Memoriam: On Active Service: Cooper, The Argus, (Saturday, 20 September 1919), p.17.
 Australian Casualties: List No.350: Victoria: Killed in Action (Cooper, J.T., North Fitzroy, 20/9/17), The Argus, (Tuesday, 6 November 1917), p.6.
 Roll of Honour: Lance-Corporal John Thomas Cooper (4753), Australian War Memorial.

External links

 
 
 AFL Player Statistics (Round by Round): Fitzroy Football Club 1907
 Photograph of Alfred Crescent School, Fitzroy North, circa 1908
 AFL Statistics 1913 Season Finals
 AFL Player Statistics (Round by Round): Fitzroy Football Club 1913
 AFL Statistics 1915 Season Finals
 AFL Player Statistics (Round by Round): Fitzroy Football Club 1915

1889 births
1917 deaths
Fitzroy Football Club players
Fitzroy Football Club Premiership players
Mitchell Medal winners
Participants in "Pioneer Exhibition Game" (London, 28 October 1916)
Australian military personnel killed in World War I
Australian Army soldiers
Australian rules footballers from Melbourne
One-time VFL/AFL Premiership players
People from Fitzroy, Victoria